Perry Smith may refer to:

 Perry Smith (politician) (1783–1852), American congressman, Connecticut
 Perry Edward Smith (1928–1965), murderer depicted in the book In Cold Blood
 Perry Smith (American football) (born 1951), NFL defensive back
 Perry H. Smith (1828–1885), judge, politician and railroad executive
 Perry M. Smith (born 1934), Air Force major general who was a military analyst for CNN
 Perry G. Smith Sr., adjutant general in Alabama